ILGAZ 4x4  is a Turkish made Mine-Resistant Ambush Protected vehicle built by Nurol Makina. ILGAZ is designed and manufactured by the Turkish armored vehicle manufacturer Nurol Makina. to meet the requirements of the Turkish Land Forces.

References

Wheeled armoured personnel carriers
Armoured fighting vehicles of Turkey